Lori Perkins (born April 8, 1959) is an American literary agent, book publisher and author.  In 2012, she founded Riverdale Avenue Books, an e-book publishing company, in Riverdale, Bronx.

Early life and education
Perkins was born in White Plains, New York, and grew up in Upper Manhattan, where she went to Barnard School for Girls and graduated from The Bronx High School of Science in 1977.  She graduated in three years from New York University in 1980.

Career
In 1982, she founded The Uptown Weekly News, a bi-monthly neighborhood newspaper that covered the Washington Heights and Inwood sections of Manhattan. In 1982, she began teaching journalism at NYU in the undergraduate program.

Literary agent
In 1987, Perkins embarked on a career as a literary agent and apprenticed with Barabara Lowenstein of Lowenstein Associates where she represented ghost buster authors Ed and Lorraine Warren and horror novelists Christopher Golden and Ray Garton. She founded her own agency the L. Perkins Agency in 1990, which has gone on to have seven books on the New York Times Best Seller List including How to Make Love Like a Porn Star by Jenna Jameson, J.K. Rowling: The Wizard Behind Harry Potter by Marc Shapiro and The Hunger Games Companion by Lois Gresh.

The New York Chapter of Romance Writers of America named her Agent of the Year in 2010, and she received An Outstanding Achievement Award from the Romantic Times Book Club in 2004.

Perkins continues to be the President of the L. Perkins Agency, which has 5 agents on staff and has foreign agents in 11 countries.

Ravenous Romance
In 2007, she co-founded the e-publishing company Ravenous Romance and was the Editorial Director from 2008 to 2012. The Story of L by Debra Hyde won a Lambda Literary Award in 2012 under Perkins' direction.

Riverdale Avenue Books
In 2012, she founded Riverdale Avenue Books located in Riverdale, Bronx, where she is President and Publisher.  Riverdale publishes e-books and print on demand (POD) books sold on many e-vendor websites.  Riverdale has 11 imprints: Desire, an erotica/erotic romance imprint; Riverdale/Magnus the award-winning imprint of LGBT titles; Pop featuring pop culture titles; Afraid, a horror line; SFF, a science fiction fantasy line; Truth, an erotic memoir line; Dagger, a mystery/thriller/suspense imprint; Verve featuring lifestyle titles; Hera featuring both the true and fictional lives and loves of women aged 35 and up; and Sports and Gaming featuring sports and gaming titles.  Riverdale is a member of the American Association of Publishers.

In 2014, Riverdale was named the Bisexual Publisher of the Year from the Bi-Writer's Association.  Riverdale's authors include Cecilia Tan, Riki Wilchins, Trinity Blacio, Marc Shapiro, Lissa Trevor, Chris Shirley, Gabby Rivera and Andrew Gray, among many others. Riverdale publishes between 50–75 books a year.

Between the Covers, is Riverdale Avenue Books' branded erotica and erotic romance reading series.  The Downtown Series is held at People Lounge in New York City on the first Friday of every month and the Uptown Series is held at An Beal Bocht in Riverdale, Bronx, on the second Monday of every month.  Riverdale is the only publisher in New York City with its own reading series open to all authors of erotica and erotic romance.

Author
She is the co-author of Everything You Always Wanted to Know About Watergate* But Were Afraid to Ask with award-winning journalist Brian J. O’Connor, as well as the historical romance novella Two Dukes and a Lady and Two Dukes are Better Than One under the pseudonym Lorna James, co-authored with USA Today best-selling author Jamie Schmidt.

She also is the author of The Cheapskate's Guide To Entertainment; How to Throw Fabulous Parties on a Budget, The Insider's Guide To Getting A Literary Agent, The Everything Family Guide to Washington, D.C., The Everything Family Guide To New York and Fifty Writers on Fifty Shades Of Grey (BenBella Books).

She has blogged about feminism for the Women's Media Center.

She is an author member of Romance Writers of America and serves on the Lambda Literary Awards Host Committee, the nation's oldest and largest literary arts organization advancing LGBTQ literature.

Editor
She is the editor of 1984 in the 21st Century, published by Riverdale Avenue Books, a collection of 25 essays and opinions on today's relevance of George Orwell's classic dystopian novel, Nineteen Eighty-Four.  Perkins has also edited more than twenty erotica anthologies, including  Hungry For Your Love, a zombie romance anthology, which was published by St. Martin's Press.

When social upheaval caused by the explosion of numerous sexual harassment and inappropriate conduct claims in the workplace swept America in the fall of 2017, within weeks Perkins had edited and published an anthology of 26 essays titled #MeToo: Essays About How and Why This Happened, What It Means and How to Make Sure It Never Happens Again. The digital book was distributed by Riverdale Avenue Books free while the print version was sold at cost. The digital version of the book rose to #1 in Amazon's Kindle Store Nonfiction / Politics & Social Sciences / Women's Studies / Feminist Theory category and #5 in Biographies & Memoirs / Leaders & Notable People / Political in the Kindle Top 100 Free Categories.

Personal life
She lives in the Bronx, and regularly speaks on panels and conferences on publishing and the value of female-centered erotica. Perkins is also a member of the Lambda Literary Awards Host Committee.

References

External links
L. Perkins Agency
Riverdale Ave Books

1959 births
Living people
People from the Bronx
People from White Plains, New York
Literary agents
American feminists
Third-wave feminism
American erotica writers
American publishers (people)
The Bronx High School of Science alumni
New York University alumni